

18001–18100 

|-id=004
| 18004 Krystosek ||  || Rebecca Jennifer Krystosek, ISEF awardee in 2003 || 
|-id=009
| 18009 Patrickgeer ||  || Patrick L. Geer, ISEF awardee in 2003 || 
|-id=012
| 18012 Marsland ||  || Kyle Anthony Marsland, ISEF awardee in 2003 || 
|-id=013
| 18013 Shedletsky ||  || Anna-Katrina Shedletsky, ISEF awardee in 2003 || 
|-id=015
| 18015 Semenkovich ||  || Nicholas Paul Semenkovich, ISEF awardee in 2003 || 
|-id=016
| 18016 Grondahl ||  || Brian Jacob Grondahl, ISEF awardee in 2003 || 
|-id=019
| 18019 Dascoli ||  || Jennifer Anne D'Ascoli, 2004 ISTS finalist and ISEF awardee in 2003 || 
|-id=020
| 18020 Amend ||  || Gregory Amend, ISEF awardee in 2003 || 
|-id=021
| 18021 Waldman ||  || Sarah Elyse Waldman, ISEF awardee in 2003 || 
|-id=022
| 18022 Pepper ||  || Brian Jeffrey Pepper, ISEF awardee in 2003 || 
|-id=024
| 18024 Dobson ||  || John Dobson (1915–2014), an American telescope maker and amateur astronomer || 
|-id=026
| 18026 Juliabaldwin ||  || Julia Ruby Baldwin, ISEF awardee in 2003 || 
|-id=027
| 18027 Gokcay ||  || Chelsea Bahar Gokcay, ISEF awardee in 2003 || 
|-id=028
| 18028 Ramchandani ||  || Joia Ramchandani, ISEF awardee in 2003 || 
|-id=032
| 18032 Geiss ||  || Johannes Geiss (born 1926), a German-born space scientist at the Swiss University of Bern † || 
|-id=043
| 18043 Laszkowska ||  || Monika Laszkowska, ISEF awardee in 2003 || 
|-id=055
| 18055 Fernhildebrandt ||  || Fern C. Hildebrandt (born 1927) instilled and cultivated an interest in astronomy in codiscoverer Gary Hug at a very early age. Resident now in Topeka, Kansas, she has been an example of dedication and triumph through difficult times and has inspired this codiscoverer to search the night sky. || 
|-id=059
| 18059 Cavalieri ||  || Bonaventura Cavalieri (1598–1647), a friar and a professor at the University of Bologna. || 
|-id=060
| 18060 Zarex ||  || Zarex, from Greek mythology. He was a grandson of Chiron, married Rhoeo after she arrived on Delos and became the step-father of Anius. || 
|-id=075
| 18075 Donasharma ||  || Dona Sarah Sharma, ISEF awardee in 2003 || 
|-id=077
| 18077 Dianeingrao ||  || Diane L. Ingrao (born 1951), an American secretary of the Warren Astronomical Society in Detroit, Michigan || 
|-id=079
| 18079 Lion-Stoppato ||  || Piero Francesco Lion-Stoppato (born 1969), an Italian space scientist at University of Padua || 
|-id=084
| 18084 Adamwohl ||  || Adam Richard Wohl, ISEF awardee in 2003 || 
|-id=086
| 18086 Emilykraft ||  || Emily Michele Kraft, ISEF awardee in 2003 || 
|-id=087
| 18087 Yamanaka ||  || Yvonne Joy Yamanaka, ISEF awardee in 2003 || 
|-id=088
| 18088 Roberteunice ||  || Robert Earl Eunice, ISEF awardee in 2003 || 
|-id=090
| 18090 Kevinkuo ||  || Kevin Chester Kuo, ISEF awardee in 2003 || 
|-id=091
| 18091 Iranmanesh ||  || Arya Mohammad Iranmanesh, ISEF awardee in 2003 || 
|-id=092
| 18092 Reinhold ||  || Kimberly Elise Reinhold, ISEF awardee in 2003 || 
|-id=095
| 18095 Frankblock ||  || Frank Emmanuel Block, ISEF awardee in 2003 || 
|-id=099
| 18099 Flamini ||  || Enrico Flamini (born 1951), an Italian astronomer || 
|-id=100
| 18100 Lebreton ||  || Jean-Pierre Lebreton (born 1949), French astronomer || 
|}

18101–18200 

|-
| 18101 Coustenis ||  || Athéna Coustenis, French astronomer || 
|-id=102
| 18102 Angrilli ||  || Francesco Angrilli, Italian space scientist || 
|-id=104
| 18104 Mahalingam ||  || Satish Mahalingam, ISEF awardee in 2003 || 
|-id=106
| 18106 Blume ||  || William H. Blume, American senior space mission designer || 
|-id=110
| 18110 HASI ||  || The 44 members of the Huygens Atmospheric Structure Instrument (HASI) team || 
|-id=111
| 18111 Pinet ||  || Patrick Pinet, French astronomer || 
|-id=112
| 18112 Jeanlucjosset ||  || Jean-Luc Josset, Swiss astronomer, director of the Space Exploration Institute in Neuchâtel, Switzerland || 
|-id=113
| 18113 Bibring ||  || Jean-Pierre Bibring, French astronomer and planetary scientist || 
|-id=114
| 18114 Rosenbush ||  || Vera K. Rosenbush, Ukrainian astronomer || 
|-id=115
| 18115 Rathbun ||  || Donald Rathbun, American neurologist || 
|-id=116
| 18116 Prato ||  || Prato province, Tuscany, Italy, where the Museo di Scienze Planetarie (Museum of Planetary Sciences) is located || 
|-id=117
| 18117 Jonhodge ||  || Jonathon Hodge (born 1948), American teacher and astronomy communicator || 
|-id=119
| 18119 Braude ||  || Semen Ya. Braude, Russian radioastronomer || 
|-id=120
| 18120 Lytvynenko ||  || Leonid Mikolajovich Lytvynenko (Leonid Nikolaevich Lytvynenko), Ukrainian radioastronomer || 
|-id=121
| 18121 Konovalenko ||  || Alexandr A. Konovalenko, Ukrainian radioastronomer || 
|-id=122
| 18122 Forestamartin ||  || Franco Foresta Martin, Italian science popularizer, scientific editor for the newspaper Corriere della Sera || 
|-id=123
| 18123 Pavan ||  || Luciano Pavan, Italian musician, writer, painter and amateur astronomer || 
|-id=124
| 18124 Leeperry ||  || Lee Taylor Perry, ISEF awardee in 2003 || 
|-id=125
| 18125 Brianwilson || 2000 OF || Californian songwriter and record producer Brian Wilson (born 1942) contributed to 1960s pop culture, with songs like Fun Fun Fun, exemplifying the pastimes of modern teenage life, through the Beach Boys' pop group harmonies, giving out very good vibrations indeed. || 
|-id=127
| 18127 Denversmith ||  || Denver L. Smith, ISEF awardee in 2003 || 
|-id=128
| 18128 Wysner ||  || Laura C. Wysner, ISEF awardee in 2003 || 
|-id=132
| 18132 Spector ||  || Phil Spector, American record producer and songwriter † || 
|-id=142
| 18142 Adamsidman ||  || Adam Daniel Sidman, ISEF awardee in 2003 || 
|-id=148
| 18148 Bellier ||  || Guy and Caroline Bellier, French orthopedic surgeons, and their sons Thomas and Margaux || 
|-id=149
| 18149 Colombatti ||  || Giacomo Colombatti, Italian planetologist || 
|-id=150
| 18150 Lopez-Moreno ||  || José J. Lopez-Moreno, Spanish planetologist || 
|-id=151
| 18151 Licchelli ||  || Domenico Licchelli, Italian astronomer and popularizer || 
|-id=152
| 18152 Heidimanning ||  || Heidi L. K. Manning, American planetary scientist || 
|-id=155
| 18155 Jasonschuler ||  || Jason Michael Schuler, ISEF awardee in 2003 || 
|-id=156
| 18156 Kamisaibara ||  || Kamisaibara, the village in Okayama prefecture. || 
|-id=157
| 18157 Craigwright ||  || Craig John Wright, ISEF awardee in 2003 || 
|-id=158
| 18158 Nigelreuel ||  || Nigel Forest Reuel, ISEF awardee in 2003 || 
|-id=159
| 18159 Andrewcook ||  || Andrew Gordon Cook, ISEF awardee in 2003 || 
|-id=160
| 18160 Nihon Uchu Forum ||  || Nihon Uchu Forum, Japanese editor of the Japan Aerospace Exploration Agency (JAXA) annual NASDA Note. || 
|-id=161
| 18161 Koshiishi ||  || Hajime Koshiishi (born 1930) became interested in investigating minor planets as a natural resource. He organized a society for the study of NEAs and their resource utilization and made efforts toward the establishment of the Japan Spaceguard Association || 
|-id=162
| 18162 Denlea ||  || Jeremy Micah Denlea, ISEF awardee in 2003 || 
|-id=163
| 18163 Jennalewis ||  || Jenna Lyanne Lewis, ISEF awardee in 2003, and IFAA recipient || 
|-id=167
| 18167 Buttani ||  || Buttani Philippe (born 1966), a friend of one of the discoverers, started the "CCD adventure" with him in July 1994 || 
|-id=169
| 18169 Amaldi || 2000 QF || The nuclear physicist Edoardo Amaldi (1908–1989) was part of the team of Enrico Fermi and contributed to the completion of the first particle accelerator in Italy. || 
|-id=170
| 18170 Ramjeawan ||  || Khaivchandra Ramjeawan, ISEF awardee in 2003 || 
|-id=171
| 18171 Romaneskue ||  || Roman Garrick Eskue, ISEF awardee in 2003 || 
|-id=174
| 18174 Khachatryan ||  || George Alexander Khachatryan, ISEF awardee in 2003 || 
|-id=175
| 18175 Jenniferchoy ||  || Jennifer Tze-Heng Choy, ISEF awardee in 2003 || 
|-id=176
| 18176 Julianhong ||  || Julian C. Hong, ISEF awardee in 2003 || 
|-id=177
| 18177 Harunaga ||  || Jill Shizuko Harunaga, ISEF awardee in 2003 || 
|-id=180
| 18180 Irenesun ||  || Irene Yuan Sun, ISEF awardee in 2003 || 
|-id=182
| 18182 Wiener ||  || Norbert Wiener (1894–1964) contributed to many areas of mathematics, including cybernetics, stochastic processes and quantum theory. He was the author of the book Cybernetics, or control and communication in the animal and machine (1948). || 
|-id=184
| 18184 Dianepark ||  || Diane Hyemin Park, ISEF awardee in 2003 || 
|-id=189
| 18189 Medeobaldia ||  || Maria Elena De Obaldia, ISEF awardee in 2003 || 
|-id=190
| 18190 Michaelpizer ||  || Michael J. Pizer, ISEF awardee in 2003 || 
|-id=191
| 18191 Rayhe ||  || Ray Chengchuan He, ISEF awardee in 2003 || 
|-id=192
| 18192 Craigwallace ||  || Craig J. Wallace, ISEF awardee in 2003 || 
|-id=193
| 18193 Hollilydrury ||  || Hollilyne Drury, ISEF awardee in 2003 || 
|-id=196
| 18196 Rowberry ||  || Megan Rowberry, ISEF awardee in 2003 || 
|}

18201–18300 

|-id=228
| 18228 Hyperenor || 3163 T-1 || Hyperenor, one of the sons of Panthoos and a great hero on the Trojan side. || 
|-id=235
| 18235 Lynden-Bell || 1003 T-2 || Donald Lynden-Bell, a professor at the University of Cambridge. || 
|-id=236
| 18236 Bernardburke || 1059 T-2 || Bernard Burke (born 1928), a professor of physics at the Massachusetts Institute of Technology. || 
|-id=237
| 18237 Kenfreeman || 1182 T-2 || Kenneth C. Freeman, a professor at the Australian National University. || 
|-id=238
| 18238 Frankshu || 1241 T-2 || Frank Shu (born 1943), a president of National Tsinghua University in Taiwan and former professor at the University of California in Berkeley. || 
|-id=239
| 18239 Ekers || 1251 T-2 || Ronald Ekers, current president of the IAU and ex-director of the Australian Telescope National Facility and of the Very Large Array. || 
|-id=240
| 18240 Mould || 1317 T-2 || Jeremy Mould, Australian astronomer || 
|-id=241
| 18241 Genzel || 1325 T-2 || Reinhard Genzel (born 1952), German astronomer and 2020 Physics Nobel prize || 
|-id=242
| 18242 Peebles || 2102 T-2 || Princeton theoretical cosmologist Jim Peebles (born 1935) and 2019 Physics Nobel Prize, plays a central role in the understanding of the evolution and structure of the universe. His studies of the evolution of matter in the earliest moments of the universe were critical in the establishment of the Big Bang theory as a widely accepted hypothesis. || 
|-id=243
| 18243 Gunn || 2272 T-2 || James Edward Gunn, a professor at Princeton University. || 
|-id=244
| 18244 Anneila || 3008 T-2 || Anneila Sargent, American astronomer || 
|-id=263
| 18263 Anchialos || 5167 T-2 || The Greek heroes Anchialos and Menestheus were together on their chariot when they were killed by Hector. || 
|-id=268
| 18268 Dardanos || 2140 T-3 || Dardanos, a son of Zeus and a nymph, mythical ancestor of the Trojans. || 
|-id=278
| 18278 Drymas || 4035 T-3 || Drymas, a king of Phrygia and father of Priam's second wife Hekabe (in Latin, Hecuba). || 
|-id=281
| 18281 Tros || 4317 T-3 || Tros, a grandson of Dardanos. His country was named Troas after him, and its principal city was Troy. || 
|-id=282
| 18282 Ilos || 4369 T-3 || Ilos, the oldest son of Tros, and he built the citadel Ilion, also named Ilios. Ilos was the father of Laomedon and the grandfather of Priam. || 
|-id=284
| 18284 Tsereteli || 1970 PU || Zurab Konstantinovich Tsereteli (b.1934), world-renowned Russian sculptor. || 
|-id=285
| 18285 Vladplatonov || 1972 GJ || Vladimir Petrovich Platonov (born 1938), well-known journalist and documentary-film director, is the author of many books, articles and films about the creators of space-rocket technologies and the many challenges in that field || 
|-id=286
| 18286 Kneipp ||  || Sebastian Kneipp (1821–1897), a German priest, skilled in the art of healing, introduced manifold applications of cold and warm water and suggested that a healthy way of living conformed to nature. His papers were translated into many languages and were an essential influence on modern physical therapeutics and balneology. || 
|-id=287
| 18287 Verkin ||  || Boris Ieremievich Verkin (1919–1990), a Ukrainian Soviet physicist and creator of the scientific school of cryogenic physics and technology, was the founder and first director of the Institute for Low Temperature Physics and Engineering in Kharkiv || 
|-id=288
| 18288 Nozdrachev ||  || Aleksandr Danilovich Nozdrachev (born 1931), a professor and head of physiology at St. Petersburg University. || 
|-id=289
| 18289 Yokoyamakoichi ||  || Koichi Yokoyama (born 1940) is a professor emeritus of the National Astronomical observatory, Japan. || 
|-id=290
| 18290 Sumiyoshi ||  || Sumiyoshi, in the south of Osaka prefecture, is an important port for trade between Japan and the Korean Peninsula. The Sumiyoshi Taisha shrine, a guardian of voyage, was founded in 211. At the shrine there is a lighthouse, believed to be the oldest in Japan. || 
|-id=291
| 18291 Wani ||  || Wani was a scholar who came to Japan from Korea in the second half of the 4th century. He brought ten volumes of The Analects of Confucius and one volume of the Thousand Character Classic to Japan. || 
|-id=292
| 18292 Zoltowski || 1977 FB || Frank B. Zoltowski (born 1957), an Australian discoverer of minor planets who made numerous critical observations of near-earth objects, notably a dramatic recovery of 1999 AN10, while he was working in South Australia during 1997–1999. He continued to make astrometric contributions on his return to the U.S. || 
|-id=293
| 18293 Pilyugin ||  || Nikolay Alekseyevich Pilyugin, 20th-century Russian designer of autonomous control systems and computers for space rocketry || 
|-id=294
| 18294 Rudenko ||  || Anatolij Afanas'evich Rudenko (born 1949) is a full member of the Tsiolkovsky Russian Academy of Cosmonautics and an authority on systems analysis and high technology. He was a member of the team that created aerospace systems and developed powerful liquid-propellant engines || 
|-id=295
| 18295 Borispetrov ||  || Boris Mikhajlovich Petrov, Russian journalist, director of the St. Petersburg regional center of the Russian News Agency ITAR-TASS || 
|}

18301–18400 

|-
| 18301 Konyukhov ||  || Fyodor Fyodorovich Konyukhov (born 1951) has performed 50 extensive travels, mainly alone. He conquered both poles and all the highest mountains of the world. The renowned Russian traveler has taken many of the world's most difficult land and sea routes and has sailed around the world three times. || 
|-id=302
| 18302 Körner ||  || Harald Körner (1881–1953) was headmaster of the private elementary school in Lund from 1916 to 1944, and a proponent of education for girls. || 
|-id=321
| 18321 Bobrov ||  || Vsevolod Bobrov (1922–1979), a Soviet ice hockey and football champion || 
|-id=322
| 18322 Korokan ||  || Korokan was a guest house for foreign envoys built in Chikushi (now Fukuoka city) in the 8th century. || 
|-id=334
| 18334 Drozdov ||  || Nikolaj Nikolaevich Drozdov (born 1937), a Russian professor of biology and the author and chief producer of very popular TV program V mire zhivotnykh (In the World of Animals). || 
|-id=335
| 18335 San Cassiano ||  || San Cassiano, an Italian village in the hills near Verona in northern Italy, is renowned for its high-quality oil (Grignano) and wine (Amarone). Its isolated location affords views of both the Alps and the Adriatic Sea. || 
|-id=343
| 18343 Asja || 1989 TN || Asja Geyer-Fischer (born 1934) is a splendid pianist with a great love for Mozart and Chopin. She is an especially good teacher for children. In 1962 she followed her husband, astronomer E. H. Geyer to the Boyden Observatory, South Africa, where he had been appointed Director of the observatory for two years. || 
|-id=349
| 18349 Dafydd ||  || Dafydd ap Llywelyn (c. 1212–1246), prince of Wales || 
|-id=359
| 18359 Jakobstaude ||  || Jakob Staude (born 1944) is staff astronomer at the Heidelberg Max Planck Institute for Astronomy and a well-known expert on star formation. Since 1981 Staude has also served as editor-in-chief of the German journal Sterne und Weltraum. || 
|-id=360
| 18360 Sachs ||  || Hans Sachs (1494–1576), master of the shoemaker guild in Nuremberg from 1520, is the most important German poet of the sixteenth century. || 
|-id=365
| 18365 Shimomoto ||  || Shigeo Shimomoto (born 1963), a Japanese amateur astronomer and computer programmer. || 
|-id=368
| 18368 Flandrau ||  || The Flandrau Science Center and Planetarium in Tucson, Arizona. It is part of the University of Arizona. || 
|-id=376
| 18376 Quirk || 1991 SQ || Steve Quirk (born 1958), an Australian amateur astronomer and astrophotographer who also operates fireball patrol and meteor video cameras (Src). || 
|-id=377
| 18377 Vetter ||  || John Francis Vetter (born 1945), an Australian amateur astronomer and retired automotive mechanic, who established the Mudgee Observatory in 2005 (Src). || 
|-id=379
| 18379 Josévandam ||  || José van Dam (born 1940), a Belgian bass-baritone, who entered the Brussels Royal Conservatory at the age of 17 || 
|-id=381
| 18381 Massenet || 1991 YU || Jules Massenet (1842–1912) was a prolific French composer of operas. His greatest successes were Manon (1884), Werther (1892) and Thaïs (1894). The Méditation, a violin solo with orchestra from Thaïs, became world-famous. In 1878 he was elected a member of the Académie des Beaux-Arts || 
|-id=395
| 18395 Schmiedmayer ||  ||  (born 1960), an Austrian physicist and a leading expert in the field of quantum optics. || 
|-id=396
| 18396 Nellysachs ||  || Nelly Sachs (1891–1970), a German-Swedish poet, dramatist, and Nobel Prize winner. || 
|-id=398
| 18398 Bregenz ||  || Bregenz, capital of the Austrian province of Vorarlberg || 
|-id=399
| 18399 Tentoumushi ||  || The Tentoumushi astronomy club was named after the seven-starred ladybug. The club received an award from the city of Komatsu for its astronomy popularization. || 
|-id=400
| 18400 Muramatsushigeru ||  || Shigeru Muramatsu (born 1951), a Japanese amateur astronomer living in Imabari, Ehime. || 
|}

18401–18500 

|-id=403
| 18403 Atsuhirotaisei || 1993 AG || Atsuhiro Ikuta (1999–2011) and Taisei Ikuta (2003–2011) were two brothers who loved the stars. They died in an automobile accident on the night of 2011 December 10, on their return home from viewing a total lunar eclipse || 
|-id=404
| 18404 Kenichi ||  || Kenichi Miyoshi, an amateur astronomer who has contributed to astronomical awareness in Ehime Prefecture over many years. || 
|-id=412
| 18412 Kruszelnicki || 1993 LX || Karl Kruszelnicki (born 1948), an Australian science communicator. || 
|-id=413
| 18413 Adamspencer ||  || Adam Spencer (born 1969) is an Australian mathematics communicator, television and radio presenter. || 
|-id=418
| 18418 Ujibe ||  || Tadashi Ujibe, an amateur astronomer who constructed the three-meter dome of his own private observatory. || 
|-id=426
| 18426 Maffei ||  || Paolo Maffei, Italian astronomer † || 
|-id=430
| 18430 Balzac ||  || Honoré de Balzac (1799–1850), the creator of the French realistic novel. || 
|-id=431
| 18431 Stazzema || 1994 BM || Stazzema, a pleasant village located in the Alpi Apuane mountains of Tuscany, Italy. Since 2000, it has been the site of the Italian Park of Peace. Name proposed by Mario Di Martino || 
|-id=434
| 18434 Mikesandras ||  || Mike Sandras, American director of the Kenner Planetarium, Louisiana. || 
|-id=441
| 18441 Cittadivinci || 1994 PE || Vinci is a small beautiful village in Tuscany, where the great genius Leonardo da Vinci was born in 1452. For this reason it is visited by thousands of people each year, eager to visit either the museum or see Leonardo's machines. || 
|-id=449
| 18449 Rikwouters ||  || Rik Wouters, 19th/20th-century Belgian fauve painter and sculptor || 
|-id=453
| 18453 Nishiyamayukio || 1994 TT || Yukio Nishiyama (born 1950) is the president of a shipbuilding design company who spends his evenings as an amateur astronomer. || 
|-id=456
| 18456 Mišík || 1995 ES || Vladimír Mišík (born 1947), a Czech rock and blues guitarist, singer and songwriter. || 
|-id=458
| 18458 Caesar ||  || Emperor Gaius Julius Caesar (100-44 B.C.) promulgated in 46 B.C. on the advice of the Alexandrine astronomer Sosigenes what is now called the Julian calendar. || 
|-id=460
| 18460 Pecková || 1995 PG || Dagmar Pecková, Czech mezzo-soprano †  || 
|-id=461
| 18461 Seiichikanno || 1995 QQ || Seiichi Kanno (born 1954) is an education consultant and an amateur astronomer, who has observed the planets since 1970. He built an observatory in Kaminoyama city, Yamagata, in 1989, and now observes the planets with a video camera || 
|-id=462
| 18462 Riccò ||  || Annibale Riccò, Italian astronomer † || 
|-id=467
| 18467 Nagatatsu ||  || Tatsuo Nagahama (born 1952), an amateur astronomer. || 
|-id=469
| 18469 Hakodate ||  || Hakodate, located at the southernmost part of Hokkaido, is a prosperous city of fishing and tourism. The night view from Mount Hakodate is one of the best tourist attractions in Japan || 
|-id=472
| 18472 Hatada ||  || Naoki Hatada (born 1967), an editor of the Inagawa Observatory web site since 2003. || 
|-id=473
| 18473 Kikuchijun ||  || Jun Kikuchi (born 1967) purchased his first telescope during the height of Halley's Comet fever in 1986. Though cloudy skies thwarted his attempts at comet photography, his interest in solar eclipse photography led him to France in 1999, and to China in 2008 and 2009 || 
|-id=493
| 18493 Demoleon ||  || Demoleon, a Trojan warrior and son of Antenor, was struck in the head by Achilles' spear || 
|-id=497
| 18497 Nevězice ||  || Nevězice, village and place of a Celtic oppidum in central Bohemia, the Czech Republic †  || 
|-id=498
| 18498 Cesaro || 1996 MN || Ernesto Cesàro (1859–1906), a prolific mathematician and professor at the universities of Palermo and Naples. || 
|-id=499
| 18499 Showalter || 1996 MR || Mark R. Showalter (born 1957), planetary scientist at the SETI Institute, is (co-)discover of the Jovian gossamer ring, Saturnian moon Pan, Uranian moons Mab and Cupid, two faint Uranian rings, Neptunian moon S/2004 N 1, and Plutonian moons Kerberos and Styx. He is the leader of the Planetary Data Systems Rings Node || 
|}

18501–18600 

|-id=505
| 18505 Caravelli ||  || Vito Caravelli (1724–1800), a professor of mathematics at the Naval Institute of Naples. || 
|-id=509
| 18509 Bellini ||  || Vincenzo Bellini (1801–1835), an Italian composer best known for his "Norma" and "I puritani". || 
|-id=510
| 18510 Chasles || 1996 SN || Michel Chasles (1793–1880), a professor at the École Polytechnique and later at the Sorbonne. || 
|-id=520
| 18520 Wolfratshausen ||  || Wolfratshausen, a city in southern Bavaria, Germany, has a long history extending back to the original name found in court papers by Holy Roman Emperor Heinrich II in 1003. Rainer Maria Rilke (1875–1926) stayed in the city with Lou Andreas-Salome (1861–1937) in 1897 || 
|-id=524
| 18524 Tagatoshihiro ||  || Toshihiro Taga (born 1951) is a Japanese amateur astronomer and president of the Tottori Society of Astronomy. He is a popularizer of astronomy. || 
|-id=531
| 18531 Strakonice ||  || Strakonice, a town in southern Bohemia, the Czech Republic † ‡  || 
|-id=542
| 18542 Broglio ||  || Luigi Broglio, Italian aeronautical engineer, conceptor and director of the San Marco programme † || 
|-id=548
| 18548 Christoffel ||  || Elwin Bruno Christoffel (1829–1900), a professor at various German universities. || 
|-id=550
| 18550 Maoyisheng ||  || Yisheng Mao (1896–1989) was a world-renowned scientist and one of the founders of modern bridge engineering of China.  || 
|-id=553
| 18553 Kinkakuji ||  || Kinkakuji is the popular name of a gilded pavilion in the Rokuon-ji temple complex (a World Cultural Heritage site) in Kyoto, Japan. || 
|-id=555
| 18555 Courant ||  || Richard Courant (1888–1972) studied and later taught at Göttingen. In 1934 he became a professor at New York University, where he founded and led one of the most prestigious institutes of applied mathematics, later named in his honor. || 
|-id=556
| 18556 Battiato ||  || Franco Battiato, Italian (Sicilian) polyhedric artist and amateur astronomer † || 
|-id=560
| 18560 Coxeter ||  || Harold Scott MacDonald Coxeter (born 1907), an English-Canadian mathematician and former professor at the University of Toronto. || 
|-id=561
| 18561 Fengningding ||  || Fengning Ding (born 1994), ISTS awardee in 2012 || 
|-id=562
| 18562 Ellenkey ||  || Ellen Key (1849–1926) was a Swedish feminist and writer on subjects such as family life, ethics and education. She was on early advocate of child-centered approach to education. || 
|-id=563
| 18563 Danigoldman ||  || Danielle Goldman (born 1994), ISTS awardee in 2012 || 
|-id=564
| 18564 Caseyo ||  || Casey O'Connell, mentor at the ISTS in 2012 || 
|-id=565
| 18565 Selg ||  || Timothy Selg, mentor at the ISTS in 2012 || 
|-id=567
| 18567 Segenthau ||  || Segenthau, Banat village and childhood home of the discoverer † || 
|-id=568
| 18568 Thuillot ||  || William Thuillot (born 1951) works at the Institut de Mécanique Céleste on the theory of the motions of Jupiter's Galilean satellites, including analysis of observations of eclipses by the planet and mutual phenomena. || 
|-id=572
| 18572 Rocher ||  || Patrick Rocher (born 1951) works at the Institut de Mécanique Céleste in Paris. His main task has been to build an integration package to compute orbital parameters for minor planets and comets. || 
|-id=574
| 18574 Jeansimon ||  || Jean-Louis Simon (born 1940) works at the Paris Institut de Mécanique Céleste on analytical planetary theory. He produced the first values of the secular variation of the orbital semimajor axes of the planets. || 
|-id=579
| 18579 Duongtuyenvu ||  || Duong Tuyen Vu (born 1933) works at the Paris Institut de Mécanique Céleste on ephemerides of natural satellites. || 
|-id=581
| 18581 Batllo ||  || Valerie Batllo (born 1967) works on cometary orbits at the Institut de Mécanique Céleste in Paris. She studies in particular how the short-period comets could be produced by encounters with the giant planets. || 
|-id=583
| 18583 Francescopedani ||  || Francesco Pedani (1953–1998) was an amateur astronomer, biologist and school teacher of science and mathematics. In 1988 he founded the Societ Astronomica Fiorentina, an association of amateur astronomers based in Florence, Italy. He was its first president until his untimely death. || 
|-id=593
| 18593 Wangzhongcheng ||  || Wang Zhongcheng (born 1925), neurosurgeon-academician of the Chinese Academy of Engineering. || 
|-id=596
| 18596 Superbus ||  || Tarquinius Superbus, seventh and last king of Rome, reigned from 534 to 509 B.C. || 
|}

18601–18700 

|-
| 18601 Zafar ||  || Abu-Bakr Zafar (born 1985), ISEF awardee in 2003 || 
|-id=602
| 18602 Lagillespie ||  || Lacy Ann Gillespie (born 1985), ISEF awardee in 2003 || 
|-id=605
| 18605 Jacqueslaskar ||  || Jacques Laskar (born 1955) is principally concerned with the chaotic behavior of the principal planets. A staff member of the Institut de Mécanique Céleste in Paris, he was the first to show the chaotic motion of the inner solar system and the stabilization of the obliquity of the ecliptic by the moon. || 
|-id=609
| 18609 Shinobuyama ||  || Shinobuyama, called "Fuku-Shima" many centuries ago, is a small mountain in Fukushima city, Japan. This beloved mountain is the symbol of the city. || 
|-id=610
| 18610 Arthurdent ||  || Arthur Philip Dent, character in The Hitchhiker's Guide to the Galaxy† || 
|-id=611
| 18611 Baudelaire ||  || French poet Charles Baudelaire (1821–1867) was one of the major innovators of French literature. His Les Fleurs du Mal (1857) is considered to rank with the finest of French poetry. Baudelaire is particularly known for his excellent translations of Poe's Tales, a writer whose style much resembled his own || 
|-id=617
| 18617 Puntel ||  || Nathalie Puntel (born 1968) is a French woman who prefers deep-sky pictures to searches for minor planets. || 
|-id=623
| 18623 Pises ||  || Observatoire des Pises, which was inaugurated in 1991, is located in the South of France. It is the Montpellier astronomical society observatory. || 
|-id=624
| 18624 Prévert ||  || Jacques Prévert, French poet and screenwriter. || 
|-id=626
| 18626 Michaelcarr ||  || Michael Carr (born 1947) is an instrument maker who worked at Caltech and then Princeton University. || 
|-id=627
| 18627 Rogerbonnet ||  || Roger-Maurice Bonnet (born 1937) is a French experimental astrophysicist specializing in stellar physics. From 1983 to 2001 he was Science Director of ESA and he created Horizon 2000. Under his lead, ESA launched the scientific projects, Giotto, Hipparcos, ISO, XMM, SOHO, Cluster, Cassini-Huygens and HST. || 
|-id=628
| 18628 Taniasagrati ||  || Tania Sagrati (1967–2012) was the cousin of the second discoverer. She graduated from the Art Institute of Firenze and worked as an interior decorator. || 
|-id=631
| 18631 Maurogherardini ||  || Mauro Gherardini (1941–2008), a surveyor by profession, was a great lover of the sky. He was a popularizer of astronomy, promoting astro-navigation at evening school events. || 
|-id=632
| 18632 Danielsson ||  || Ann-Kristin "Kikki" Danielsson (born 1952) is a well-known and popular country singer from Sweden. || 
|-id=634
| 18634 Champigneulles ||  || Champigneulles, Meurthe-et-Moselle, France. || 
|-id=635
| 18635 Frouard ||  || Frouard, Meurthe-et-Moselle, France. || 
|-id=636
| 18636 Villedepompey ||  || Pompey, a French village || 
|-id=637
| 18637 Liverdun ||  || Liverdun, a French village || 
|-id=638
| 18638 Nouet ||  || Nicolas-Antoine Nouet (1740–1811), an astronomer at the Observatoire de Paris, traveled to St. Domingue to map the island. Later he mapped the Rhine region and traveled with Napoleon Bonaparte to Egypt, where he created a map of that country. || 
|-id=639
| 18639 Aoyunzhiyuanzhe ||  || Aoyunzhiyuanzhe, meaning "Olympic Games Volunteer", honors the 1.7 million volunteers whose work, devotion, smiles and service during the 2008 Olympic and Paralympic Games touched the whole world, setting a milestone in voluntary service and opening a fresh chapter in volunteerism in China || 
|-id=643
| 18643 van Rysselberghe ||  || Théo van Rysselberghe, 19th/20th-century Belgian pointillistic and impressionistic painter || 
|-id=644
| 18644 Arashiyama ||  || Arashiyama, situated west of Kyoto city, is the area that includes Arashiyama mountain and the shores of the Katsuragawa river, including the Togetsukyo bridge. It is known nationally for its cherry blossoms and colorful autumn leaves and is designated as a National Historic Site and Place of Scenic Beauty. || 
|-id=647
| 18647 Václavhübner ||  || Václav Hübner (1922–2000), a Czech amateur astronomer † || 
|-id=649
| 18649 Fabrega ||  || Joaquin Fabrega (born 1967), an amateur astronomer from Panama || 
|-id=653
| 18653 Christagünt ||  || Christa and Günter Rothermel, parents of uncredited German co-discoverer Jens Rothermel || 
|-id=656
| 18656 Mergler ||  || Natalie Rose Mergler, ISEF awardee in 2003 || 
|-id=658
| 18658 Rajdev ||  || Priya Ashoke Rajdev, ISEF awardee in 2003 || 
|-id=659
| 18659 Megangross ||  || Megan Chaya Gross, ISEF awardee in 2003 || 
|-id=661
| 18661 Zoccoli ||  || Christina Marie Mariolana Zoccoli, ISEF awardee in 2003 || 
|-id=662
| 18662 Erinwhite ||  || Erin Margaret White, ISEF awardee in 2003 || 
|-id=663
| 18663 Lynnta ||  || Lynn Marie Torrech-Antonetty, ISEF awardee in 2003 || 
|-id=664
| 18664 Rafaelta ||  || Rafael Andres Torrech-Antonetty, ISEF awardee in 2003 || 
|-id=665
| 18665 Sheenahayes ||  || Sheena Marie Hayes, ISEF awardee in 2003 || 
|-id=668
| 18668 Gottesman ||  || David Alexander Gottesman, ISEF awardee in 2003 || 
|-id=669
| 18669 Lalitpatel ||  || Lalit Ramesh Patel, ISEF awardee in 2003, and IFAA recipient || 
|-id=670
| 18670 Shantanugaur ||  || Shantanu Kadir Gaur, ISEF awardee in 2003 || 
|-id=671
| 18671 Zacharyrice ||  || Zachary Philip Rice, ISEF awardee in 2003 || 
|-id=672
| 18672 Ashleyamini ||  || Ashley Ali Amini, ISEF awardee in 2003 || 
|-id=675
| 18675 Amiamini ||  || Ami Rebecca Amini, ISEF awardee in 2003 || 
|-id=676
| 18676 Zdeňkaplavcová ||  || Zdeňka Plavcová, Czech radio-astronomer †  || 
|-id=679
| 18679 Heatherenae ||  || Heather Renae Messick, ISEF awardee in 2003 || 
|-id=680
| 18680 Weirather ||  || Sara Jo Weirather, ISEF awardee in 2003 || 
|-id=681
| 18681 Caseylipp ||  || Casey Albert Lipp, ISEF awardee in 2003 || 
|-id=689
| 18689 Rodrick ||  || Richard Jean Rodrick, ISEF awardee in 2003 || 
|-id=697
| 18697 Kathanson ||  || Kathleen Suzanne Hanson, ISEF awardee in 2003 || 
|-id=698
| 18698 Racharles ||  || Rachael Ann Charles, ISEF awardee in 2003 || 
|-id=699
| 18699 Quigley ||  || Carolyn Ann Quigley, ISEF awardee in 2003 || 
|}

18701–18800 

|-id=702
| 18702 Sadowski ||  || John Paul Sadowski, ISEF awardee in 2003 || 
|-id=704
| 18704 Brychristian ||  || Bryan William Christian, ISEF awardee in 2003 || 
|-id=707
| 18707 Annchi ||  || Ann Chi, ISTS awardee in 2004, and ISEF in 2003 || 
|-id=708
| 18708 Danielappel ||  || Daniel Clayton Appel, ISEF awardee in 2003 || 
|-id=709
| 18709 Laurawong ||  || Laura Anne Wong, ISEF awardee in 2003 || 
|-id=720
| 18720 Jerryguo ||  || Jerry Ji Guo, ISEF awardee in 2003 || 
|-id=725
| 18725 Atacama ||  || The Atacama desert, which covers regions II, III and IV of Chile, is one of the driest deserts on Earth. || 
|-id=727
| 18727 Peacock ||  || Anthony J. Peacock, British-Dutch(?) project scientist for the European Space Agency Exosat and XMM-Newton missions || 
|-id=728
| 18728 Grammier ||  || Richard ("Rick") S. Grammier (1955–2011) was director of solar system exploration at NASA's Jet Propulsion Laboratory. || 
|-id=729
| 18729 Potentino ||  || Potentino castle, near Seggiano, Tuscany, Italy. || 
|-id=730
| 18730 Wingip ||  || Wing Ip (born 1947) is Vice Chancellor of the University system of Taiwan. || 
|-id=731
| 18731 Vilʹbakirov ||  || Vilʹ S. Bakirov (born 1946) is a Ukrainian sociologist, president of the Sociological Association and corresponding member of the National Academy of Sciences of Ukraine. Since 1998 he has served as rector of Kharkiv V. N. Karazin National University, where he has promoted the development of astronomy and other sciences || 
|-id=734
| 18734 Darboux ||  || Jean-Gaston Darboux (1842–1917), a French mathematician and professor at the Sorbonne. || 
|-id=735
| 18735 Chubko ||  || Larysa Sergiivna Chubko, Ukrainian astronomer || 
|-id=737
| 18737 Aliciaworley ||  || Alicia Lorraine Worley, ISEF awardee in 2003 || 
|-id=739
| 18739 Larryhu ||  || Larry Zhixing Hu, ISEF awardee in 2003 || 
|-id=745
| 18745 San Pedro ||  || San Pedro de Atacama, a town in Chile's region II, was inhabited by the Likan Antay population for thousands of years. || 
|-id=747
| 18747 Lexcen ||  || Ben Lexcen, Australian marine architect † || 
|-id=749
| 18749 Ayyubguliev ||  || Ayyub Guliyev, Azerbaijani astronomer, director of the Shamakhy Astrophysical Observatory || 
|-id=750
| 18750 Leonidakimov ||  || Leonid Afanas'evich Akimov, Ukrainian planetary scientist || 
|-id=751
| 18751 Yualexandrov ||  || Yurij Vladimirovich Alexandrov, Ukrainian planetary scientist || 
|-id=755
| 18755 Meduna ||  || Matthew Paul Meduna, ISEF awardee in 2003 || 
|-id=766
| 18766 Broderick ||  || Tamara Ann Broderick, ISEF awardee in 2003 || 
|-id=768
| 18768 Sarahbates ||  || Sarah Woodring Bates, ISEF awardee in 2003 || 
|-id=770
| 18770 Yingqiuqilei ||  || Yingqiuqi Lei, ISEF awardee in 2003 || 
|-id=771
| 18771 Sisiliang ||  || Sisi Liang, ISEF awardee in 2003 || 
|-id=773
| 18773 Bredehoft ||  || Belle Dean Bredehoft, ISEF awardee in 2003 || 
|-id=774
| 18774 Lavanture ||  || Douglas George Lavanture, ISEF awardee in 2003 || 
|-id=775
| 18775 Donaldeng ||  || Donald Eng, ISEF awardee in 2003 || 
|-id=776
| 18776 Coulter ||  || Michael Edward Coulter, ISEF awardee in 2003 || 
|-id=777
| 18777 Hobson ||  || Christina Nicole Hobson, ISEF awardee in 2003 || 
|-id=779
| 18779 Hattyhong ||  || Hatty Hong, ISEF awardee in 2003 || 
|-id=780
| 18780 Kuncham ||  || Vivek Kuncham, ISEF awardee in 2003 || 
|-id=781
| 18781 Indaram ||  || Maanasa Indaram, ISEF awardee in 2003 || 
|-id=782
| 18782 Joanrho ||  || Joan Young Rho, ISEF awardee in 2003 || 
|-id=783
| 18783 Sychamberlin ||  || Sydney JoAnne Chamberlin, ISEF awardee in 2003 || 
|-id=785
| 18785 Betsywelsh ||  || Elizabeth Jean Welsh, ISEF awardee in 2003 || 
|-id=786
| 18786 Tyjorgenson ||  || Tyler Lee Jorgenson, ISEF awardee in 2003 || 
|-id=787
| 18787 Kathermann ||  || Katherine Laura Hermann, ISEF awardee in 2003 || 
|-id=788
| 18788 Carriemiller ||  || Carrie Anna Miller, ISEF awardee in 2003 || 
|-id=789
| 18789 Metzger ||  || Vincent Tyler Metzger, ISEF awardee in 2003 || 
|-id=790
| 18790 Ericaburden ||  || Erica Mariel Burden, ISEF awardee in 2003 || 
|-id=794
| 18794 Kianafrank ||  || Kiana Laieikawai Frank, ISEF awardee in 2003 || 
|-id=796
| 18796 Acosta ||  || Iyen Abdon Acosta, ISEF awardee in 2003 || 
|-id=800
| 18800 Terresadodge ||  || Terresa Louise Dodge, ISEF awardee in 2003 || 
|}

18801–18900 

|-
| 18801 Noelleoas ||  || Noelle Joan Oas, ISEF awardee in 2003 || 
|-id=803
| 18803 Hillaryoas ||  || Hillary Joan Oas, ISEF awardee in 2003 || 
|-id=805
| 18805 Kellyday ||  || Kelly Jean Day, ISEF awardee in 2003 || 
|-id=806
| 18806 Zachpenn ||  || Zach Penn, ISEF awardee in 2003 || 
|-id=809
| 18809 Meileawertz ||  || Meilea Elise Wertz, ISEF awardee in 2003 || 
|-id=812
| 18812 Aliadler ||  || Alexandra Raisa Adler, ISEF awardee in 2003 || 
|-id=814
| 18814 Ivanovsky ||  || Oleg Genrikhovich Ivanovsky, Russian Deputy Chief Designer for the Soviet Luna and Lunokhod missions, a designer for the Vostok spacecraft, director of the Museum of the Lavochkin Space Association in Moscow || 
|-id=818
| 18818 Yasuhiko ||  || Yasuhiko Takahashi (born 1934), the younger brother-in-law of the discoverer. || 
|-id=821
| 18821 Markhavel ||  || Mark Junichi Havel, ISEF awardee in 2003 || 
|-id=823
| 18823 Zachozer ||  || Zachary Adam Ozer, ISEF awardee in 2003 || 
|-id=824
| 18824 Graves ||  || Daniel David Graves, ISEF awardee in 2003 || 
|-id=825
| 18825 Alicechai ||  || Alice Wan Chai, ISEF awardee in 2003 || 
|-id=826
| 18826 Leifer ||  || Andrew Michael Leifer, ISEF awardee in 2003 || 
|-id=830
| 18830 Pothier ||  || David Guillaume Pothier, ISEF awardee in 2003 || 
|-id=836
| 18836 Raymundto ||  || Raymund Chun-Hung To, ISEF awardee in 2003 || 
|-id=838
| 18838 Shannon || 1999 OQ || Claude Elwood Shannon (1916–2001), an American scientist || 
|-id=839
| 18839 Whiteley || 1999 PG || Brett Whiteley (1939–1992) an Abstract artist and Australia's leading painter of his generation who won all of the major Australian art prizes many times over || 
|-id=840
| 18840 Yoshioba ||  || Yoshio Oba (born 1934) is a retired professor of earth sciences at Yamagata University and an amateur astronomer who observes occultations. || 
|-id=841
| 18841 Hruška ||  || Luboš Hruška, Czech creator of the Monument to the Victims of Evil in Plzeň † || 
|-id=843
| 18843 Ningzhou ||  || Ning Zhou, ISTS awardee in 2004, and ISEF awardee in 2003 || 
|-id=845
| 18845 Cichocki ||  || Bruno Cichocki, civil engineer and amateur astronomer || 
|-id=851
| 18851 Winmesser ||  || Winston Harmon Messer, ISEF awardee in 2003 || 
|-id=855
| 18855 Sarahgutman ||  || Sarah Elizabeth Gutman, ISEF awardee in 2003 || 
|-id=857
| 18857 Lalchandani ||  || Rupa Lalchandani, ISEF awardee in 2003 || 
|-id=858
| 18858 Tecleveland ||  || Thomas Edgar Cleveland, ISEF awardee in 2003 || 
|-id=861
| 18861 Eugenishmidt ||  || Eugenia Shmidt, ISEF awardee in 2003 || 
|-id=862
| 18862 Warot ||  || Gregory Andrew Warot, ISEF awardee in 2003 || 
|-id=871
| 18871 Grauer ||  || Albert D. Grauer (born 1942), an American astronomer. || 
|-id=872
| 18872 Tammann ||  || Gustav Tammann, Swiss cosmologist † || 
|-id=873
| 18873 Larryrobinson ||  || Larry Robinson, American astronomer † || 
|-id=874
| 18874 Raoulbehrend ||  || Raoul Behrend, Swiss astronomer † || 
|-id=876
| 18876 Sooner || 1999 XM || a "sooner", a person who is settling on land in the early American west before the land was officially open to settlement. The name particularly honors the U.S. state of Oklahoma and the University of Oklahoma, alma mater of the discoverer. || 
|-id=877
| 18877 Stevendodds ||  || Steven L. Dodds (born 1961) has been furnishing telescope optics for the astronomical community since 1986. He constructed two parabolic off-axis segments (adaptive optic components) used in the Gemini North 8.1-meter telescope located on Mauna Kea. || 
|-id=880
| 18880 Toddblumberg ||  || Todd James Blumberg, ISEF awardee in 2003 || 
|-id=883
| 18883 Domegge ||  || Domegge di Cadore, a small town nestled in the Northeastern Italian Alps, surrounded by the rose-colored Dolomites, Domegge di Cadore's very dark and clear skies are an inspiration to any astronomer. || 
|-id=887
| 18887 Yiliuchen ||  || Yiliu Chen, ISEF awardee in 2003 || 
|-id=891
| 18891 Kamler ||  || Jonathan Jacques Kamler, ISEF awardee in 2003 || 
|}

18901–19000 

|-id=903
| 18903 Matsuura ||  || Takeshirou Matsuura (1818–1888), a Japanese geographer and explorer. || 
|-id=905
| 18905 Weigan ||  || Wei Gan, ISEF awardee in 2003 || 
|-id=907
| 18907 Kevinclaytor ||  || Kevin E. Claytor, ISEF awardee in 2003 || 
|-id=910
| 18910 Nolanreis ||  || Nolan Herman Reis, ISEF awardee in 2003 || 
|-id=912
| 18912 Kayfurman ||  || Kay Dee Furman, ISEF awardee in 2003 || 
|-id=918
| 18918 Nishashah ||  || Nisha Vikram Shah, ISEF awardee in 2003 || 
|-id=923
| 18923 Jennifersass ||  || Jennifer Rose Sass, ISEF awardee in 2003 || 
|-id=924
| 18924 Vinjamoori ||  || Anant Vinjamoori, ISEF awardee in 2003 || 
|-id=928
| 18928 Pontremoli ||  || Pontremoli is an Italian town. || 
|-id=930
| 18930 Athreya ||  || Khannan Kameshvaran Athreya, ISEF awardee in 2003 || 
|-id=932
| 18932 Robinhood ||  || Robin Hood, the legendary thirteenth-century English archer and outlaw of Sherwood Forest who, with his band of Merry Men, robbed rich unscrupulous officials to aid and protect the poor in what might be described as a medieval form of socialism || 
|-id=935
| 18935 Alfandmedina ||  || Alfredo Andres Medina, ISEF awardee in 2003 || 
|-id=938
| 18938 Zarabeth ||  || Zarabeth Lehr Golden, ISEF awardee in 2003 || 
|-id=939
| 18939 Sariancel ||  || Sari Ancel, ISEF awardee in 2003 || 
|-id=943
| 18943 Elaisponton ||  || Elais M. Ponton, ISEF awardee in 2003 || 
|-id=944
| 18944 Sawilliams ||  || Stephanie Alexandra Williams, ISEF awardee in 2003 || 
|-id=946
| 18946 Massar ||  || Sonny Raye Massar, ISEF awardee in 2003 || 
|-id=947
| 18947 Cindyfulton ||  || Cindy Marie Fulton, ISEF awardee in 2003 || 
|-id=948
| 18948 Hinkle ||  || Athena Leah Hinkle, ISEF awardee in 2003 || 
|-id=949
| 18949 Tumaneng ||  || Karen Andres Tumaneng, ISEF awardee in 2003 || 
|-id=950
| 18950 Marakessler ||  || Marissa Rachel Kessler, ISEF awardee in 2003 || 
|-id=953
| 18953 Laurensmith ||  || Lauren Marie Smith, ISEF awardee in 2003 || 
|-id=954
| 18954 Sarahbounds ||  || Sarah Brittany Bounds, ISEF awardee in 2003 || 
|-id=956
| 18956 Jessicarnold ||  || Jessica Lynn Arnold, ISEF awardee in 2003 || 
|-id=957
| 18957 Mijacobsen ||  || Michael Thomas Jacobsen, ISEF awardee in 2003 || 
|-id=961
| 18961 Hampfreeman ||  || Thomas Hampton Freeman, ISEF awardee in 2003 || 
|-id=964
| 18964 Fairhurst ||  || Maggie Sara Fairhurst, ISEF awardee in 2003 || 
|-id=965
| 18965 Lazenby ||  || Tanya Marie Lazenby, ISEF awardee in 2003 || 
|-id=969
| 18969 Valfriedmann ||  || Valerie Star Friedmann, ISEF awardee in 2003 || 
|-id=970
| 18970 Jenniharper ||  || Jennifer Dawn Harper, ISEF awardee in 2003 || 
|-id=973
| 18973 Crouch ||  || Kegan Kade Crouch, ISEF awardee in 2003 || 
|-id=974
| 18974 Brungardt ||  || Adam Robert Brungardt, ISEF awardee in 2003 || 
|-id=976
| 18976 Kunilraval ||  || Kunil Kaushik Raval, ISEF awardee in 2003 || 
|-id=979
| 18979 Henryfong ||  || Henry Fong, ISEF awardee in 2003 || 
|-id=980
| 18980 Johannatang ||  || Johanna Tang, ISEF awardee in 2003 || 
|-id=983
| 18983 Allentran ||  || Allen Hing Tran, ISEF awardee in 2003 || 
|-id=984
| 18984 Olathe ||  || Olathe, Kansas, location of the Sunflower Observatory † || 
|-id=987
| 18987 Irani ||  || Natasha Rustom Irani, ISEF awardee in 2003 || 
|-id=991
| 18991 Tonivanov ||  || Tonislav Ivanov Ivanov, ISEF awardee in 2003 || 
|-id=992
| 18992 Katharvard ||  || Katherine Harvard, ISEF awardee in 2003 || 
|-id=994
| 18994 Nhannguyen ||  || Nhan Duy Nguyen, ISEF awardee in 2003 || 
|-id=996
| 18996 Torasan ||  || Kiyoshi Atsumi (1928–1996), Japanese actor known for his roles in the film It's tough being a man and in the "Tora-san" series, of which there were 48 installments during 1969–1995. The Tora-san series became a huge success in Japan and received a National Honor Award in 1996 || 
|-id=997
| 18997 Mizrahi ||  || Jonathan Albert Mizrahi, ISEF awardee in 2003 || 
|}

References 

018001-019000